Min Hee-jin (born 1979) is a South Korean art director and graphic designer. She is the current CEO of ADOR, a subsidiary of entertainment company Hybe Corporation, where she previously served as chief brand officer. She was formerly a creative director at SM Entertainment, where she was responsible for the branding of groups such as Girls' Generation, Shinee, f(x), Exo and Red Velvet.

Early life 
Min was born in 1979. She attended Seoul Women's University, where she received a degree in visual design.

Career

2002–2018: SM Entertainment 
Min joined SM Entertainment in 2002 as a graphic designer. She was later promoted to creative director and led the visual branding of groups such as Girls' Generation, Shinee, f(x), Exo and Red Velvet. Her role involved overseeing the planning and production of album artwork, costumes and music videos, as well as building the artist's brand identity through non-visual means. For instance, she created an exhibition to commemorate the release of f(x)'s 4 Walls album (2015), and engaged fans in a deductive game titled "Pathcode" as part of promotions for Exo's 2015 album Exodus. During her tenure at SM, she received attention for her innovative, experimental approach to art direction, which differed from the formulaic style used by first-generation K-pop idols. Min is credited with shifting the visual direction of the K-pop industry to become more concept-driven, and is particularly noted for her work on f(x)'s 2013 album Pink Tape. She joined SM's board of directors in 2017, but left the company at the end of 2018 due to burnout.

2019–present: Hybe Corporation 
Min joined Hybe Corporation in 2019 as chief brand officer and oversaw the company's rebranding. She was appointed CEO of Hybe's new subsidiary ADOR (All Doors One Room) in November 2021. Min shared in a statement, "Our label won’t hesitate to accept new challenges and strive to create artist IP and content containing ADOR's unique philosophy." The label unveiled its first girl group NewJeans in July 2022, with Min leading their creative direction and development. They released their debut self-titled extended play on August 1.

Awards and nominations

References 

1979 births
Living people
Seoul Women's University alumni
Creative directors
South Korean art directors
South Korean graphic designers
South Korean chief executives
South Korean music industry executives
SM Entertainment people
Hybe Corporation